This is a list of Indian reserves in Canada which have over 500 people, listed in order of population from data collected during the 2006 Census of Canada, unless otherwise cited from Aboriginal Affairs. Approximately 40% of First Nations people live on federally recognized Indian reserves. Note: this list is incomplete in that many Indian Reserves are "Incompletely enumerated", meaning that "enumeration was not permitted or was interrupted before it could be completed."
There are 13 Indian reserves which have not been enumerated in the last 3 censuses.

List
Six Nations of the Grand River: 12,757
Akwesasne Mohawk Nation: 11,500
Blood (Kainai Nation) 148: 8,371
Kahnawake Mohawk Territory: 7,989
Tsinstikeptum 9, British Columbia: 7,612 (Only 1,085 of Aboriginal identity) — Westbank First Nation
Lac La Ronge First Nation: 6,653
Saddle Lake Cree Nation: 6,578
Norway House Cree Nation:6,197
Cross Lake First Nation: 6,076
Samson Cree Nation: 5,418
Stoney 142, 143, 144, Alberta: 4,956
Moose Cree First Nation: 4,500
Cree Nation of Chisasibi: 4,410
Sandy Bay 5, Manitoba: 4,144
Siksika 146, Alberta: 4,102
St. Theresa Point, Manitoba: 4,021
Garden Hill First Nation: 3,997
Eskasoni 3, Nova Scotia: 3,850 
Innu Takuaikan Uashat Mak Mani-Utenam: 3,530 
Elsipogtog First Nation: 3,600 
Ermineskin 138, Alberta: 3,290 (as of 2019)
Tyendinaga Mohawk Territory: 2,524
Peguis 1B, Manitoba: 2,513
Capilano 5, British Columbia: 2,495 
One Arrow 95, Saskatchewan: 1,935 (around)
Listuguj, Quebec: 2,400 (around)
Wikwemikong Unceded, Ontario: 2,386
Betsiamites, Quebec: 2,357
Okanagan 1, British Columbia (part): 2,192 — Okanagan Indian Band, Okanagan people, Vernon
Opaskwayak Cree Nation 21E, Manitoba: 2,187
Sagkeeng First Nation 3, Manitoba: 2,121
Pikangikum 14, Ontario: 2,100
Nelson House 170, Manitoba: 2,096
Oxford House 24, Manitoba: 1,947
Duck Lake 7, British Columbia: 1,925 (1,850 non-Aboriginal identity, 75 Aboriginal identity), — Okanagan Indian Band, Okanagan people, Lake Country
Walpole Island 46, Ontario: 1,878
Manawan, Quebec: 1,843
Sandy Lake 88, Ontario: 1,843
Split Lake 17, Manitoba (part): 1,819
Fort Albany 67, Ontario (part): 1,805
Kamloops 1, British Columbia: 1,785 (990 non-Aboriginal identity, 795 Aboriginal identity) — Kamloops Indian Band, Secwepemc people, Kamloops
Obedjiwan, Quebec: 1,782
Cowichan 1, British Columbia: 1,805 (50 non-Aboriginal identity, 1750 Aboriginal identity) — Cowichan Tribes, Coast Salish, Duncan
Fox Lake 162, Alberta: 1,753
Seekaskootch 119, Saskatchewan: 1,752
Mashteuiatsh, Quebec: 1,749
Cross Lake 19A, Manitoba: 1,663
New Songhees 1A, British Columbia: 1,643 — Songhees First Nation, Coast Salish, Esquimalt
East Saanich 2, British Columbia: 1,637
Fisher River Cree Nation 44,44A , Manitoba: 1,600 
Cross Lake 19, Manitoba: 1,586
Lac la Ronge 156, Saskatchewan: 1,534
Pukatawagan 198, Manitoba: 1,478
Penticton 1, British Columbia: 1,470 (995 non-Aboriginal identity, 475 Aboriginal identity) — Penticton Indian Band, Okanagan people, Penticton
Stanley 157, Saskatchewan: 1,467
Big River 118, Saskatchewan: 1,437
Stony Plain 135, Alberta: 1,418
Nipissing 10, Ontario: 1,413
Burrard Inlet 3, British Columbia: 1,405 (Tsleil-Waututh First Nation, Coast Salish, District of North Vancouver
Musqueam 2, British Columbia: 1,370 (760 non-Aboriginal identity, 605 Aboriginal identity) Musqueam Nation, Coast Salish Vancouver
Pelican Narrows 184B, Saskatchewan: 1,342
Piikani 147, Alberta: 1,300
White Fish Lake 128, Alberta: 1,237
Kwakwaka'wakw Alert Bay B.C: 3,666
Ebb and Flow 52, Manitoba: 1,189
Tzeachten 13, British Columbia: 1,165 (895 non-Aboriginal identity, 275 Aboriginal identity) — Sto:lo Nation, Sto:lo people, Sardis (Chilliwack)
Louis Bull 138B, Alberta: 1,180
Lac-Simon, Quebec: 1,165
Kitigan Zibi, Quebec: 1,165
Beardy's 97 and Okemasis 96, Saskatchewan: 1,161
Wasagamack, Manitoba: 1,160
Fort Hope 64, Ontario: 1,144
Waywayseecappo First Nation, Manitoba: 1,127
Esgenoôpetitj 14 (formerly Burnt Church 14): 1,120
Sturgeon Lake 101, Saskatchewan: 1,116
Chicken 224, Saskatchewan: 1,109
God's Lake 23, Manitoba: 1,105
Ahtahkakoop 104, Saskatchewan: 1,101
Wabamun 133A, Alberta: 1,088
Sioux Valley Dakota Nation, Manitoba: 1,079
Wemotaci, Quebec: 1,073
Bella Bella 1, British Columbia: 2,506 — Heiltsuk Nation, Heiltsuk people, Bella Bella
Curve Lake First Nation 35, Ontario: 1,060
Sturgeon Lake 154, Alberta: 1,051
Tsinstikeptum 10, British Columbia: 1,040 (945 non-Aboriginal identity, 105 Aboriginal identity) — Westbank First Nation, Okanagan people, West Kelowna)(According to the Westbank First Nation, approximately 6,000 non-band members and 500 First Nation Westbank band members live on the two Tsinstikeptum reserves.)
John D'Or Prairie 215, Alberta: 1,025
Kettle Point 44, Ontario: 1,020
Indian Brook 14, Nova Scotia: 1,014
Kehewin 123, Alberta: 1,007
Garden River 14, Ontario: 985
Chemawawin 2, Manitoba: 983
Mistawasis 103, Saskatchewan: 968
Alexander 134, Alberta: 962
Lac La Hache 220, Saskatchewan: 953
Hay Lake 209, Alberta: 951
La Romaine, Quebec: 926
Shamattawa 1, Manitoba: 920
Kitchenuhmaykoosib Aaki 84, Ontario: 916
Southend 200, Saskatchewan: 910
Fort William 52, Ontario: 909
Fairford 50, Manitoba (part): 904
Sagamok, Ontario: 884
Montreal Lake 106, Saskatchewan: 880
Tobique 20, New Brunswick: 878
Gordon 86, Saskatchewan: 866
Wabasca 166D, Alberta: 863
Mnjikaning First Nation 32, Ontario: 846
Red Sucker Lake, 1976, Manitoba: 845
Canoe Lake 165, Saskatchewan: 822
Lac Seul 28, Ontario: 821
Kimosom Pwatinahk 203, Saskatchewan: 821
Thunderchild First Nation 115B, Saskatchewan: 819
Chitek Lake 191, Saskatchewan: 818
Natashquan, Quebec: 810
Fond du Lac 227, Saskatchewan: 801
Makwa Lake 129B, Saskatchewan: 800
Mount Currie 6, British Columbia: 799Mount Currie Indian Band, St'at'imc/Lilwat people, Mount Currie
Little Grand Rapids 14, Manitoba: 796
White Bear 70, Saskatchewan: 796
Bella Coola 1, British Columbia: 788 — Nuxalk Nation, Nuxalk people, Bella Coola
Wabaseemoong, Ontario: 786
Utikoomak Lake 155, Alberta: 786
Skidegate 1, British Columbia: 781 — Skidegate First Nation/Council of the Haida Nation, Haida people, Skidegate
Devon 30, New Brunswick: 767
M'Chigeeng 22, Ontario: 766
Saugeen 29, Ontario: 758
Long Plain 6, Manitoba (part): 752
Unipouheos 121, Alberta: 749
Chippewas of the Thames First Nation 42, Ontario: 747
Buffalo River Dene Nation 193, Ontario: 741
Berens River 13, Manitoba: 739
Alexis 133, Alberta: 734
Waterhen 130, Saskatchewan: 727
Membertou 28B, Nova Scotia: 726
Gitanmaax 1, British Columbia: 723 — Gitxsan Nation, Old Hazelton 
Gitsegukla 1, British Columbia: 721 — Gitxsan Nation, Gitseguecla
Drift Pile River 150, Alberta: 720
James Smith 100, Saskatchewan: 708
Natuashish 2, Newfoundland and Labrador: 706
Sarnia 45, Ontario: 706
Millbrook 27, Nova Scotia: 703
Constance Lake 92, Ontario: 702
Weagamow Lake 87, Ontario: 700
Moose Lake 31A, Manitoba: 698
Masset 1, British Columbia: 694
Couchiching 16A, Ontario: 691
Poorman 88, Saskatchewan: 688
Chemainus 13, British Columbia: 684
Sliammon 1, British Columbia: 682
Kasabonika Lake, Ontario: 681
Deer Lake, Ontario: 681
Lax Kw'alaams 1, British Columbia: 679 — Tsimshian, Port Simpson
Tsawwassen Indian Reserve, British Columbia: 675 (475 non-Aboriginal identity, 200 Aboriginal identity) — Tsawaassen First Nation, Coast Salish people, Tsawwassen (Delta)
Assiniboine 76, Saskatchewan: 671
Kitsakie 156B, Saskatchewan: 671
Marktosis 15, British Columbia: 661 — Tla-o-qui-aht First Nations, Nuu-chah-nulth people, Marktosis (in Clayoquot Sound, NW of Tofino) 
Clearwater River Dene 222, Saskatchewan: 658
Red Pheasant 108, Saskatchewan: 656
Priest's Valley 6, British Columbia: 655 (555 non-Aboriginal identity, 105 Aboriginal identity) — Okanagan Indian Band, Okanagan people, Vernon
Grand Rapids 33, Manitoba: 651
Wabasca 166A, Alberta: 648
Poplar River 16, Manitoba: 643
Montana 139, Alberta: 635
English River 21, Ontario: 633
Whycocomagh 2, Nova Scotia: 623
Whitefish Bay 32A, Ontario: 622
Hole or Hollow Water 10, Ontario: 619
Flying Dust First Nation 105, Saskatchewan: 619
Dog Creek 46, Manitoba: 617
Kispiox 1, British Columbia: 617
Webequie, Ontario: 614
Pine Creek 66A, Manitoba: 614
Woyenne 27, British Columbia: 614 — Lake Babine Nation, Dakelh people, burns Lake 
Cote 64, Saskatchewan: 607
Cross Lake 19E, Manitoba: 605
Lac Brochet 197A, Manitoba: 604
Shoal River Indian Reserve 65A, Manitoba: 603
Osoyoos 1, British Columbia: 600 (255 non-Aboriginal identity, 345 Aboriginal identity) — Osoyoos Indian Band, Okanagan people, Osoyoos
Cumberland House Cree Nation 20, Saskatchewan: 595
Sucker Creek 150A, Alberta: 594
Neyaashiinigmiing 27, Ontario: 591
Carrot River 29A, Saskatchewan: 590
Christian Island 30, Ontario: 584
Little Pine 116, Saskatchewan: 577
Bloodvein 12, Manitoba: 576
South Saanich 1, British Columbia: 571
Mission 1, British Columbia: 569 — Esla7an/Squamish Nation, Squamish people, North Vancouver
Roseau River 2, Manitoba: 568
Rankin Location 15D, Ontario: 566
Chehalis 5, British Columbia: 560 — Chehalis First Nation, Sto:lo people, Chehalis
God's River 86A, Manitoba: 556
Muskoday First Nation, Saskatchewan: 553
Seabird Island, British Columbia: 548 — Seabird First Nation, Sto:lo people, Sea Bird Island (near Agassiz)
Shoal Lake 28A, Saskatchewan: 545
Ministikwan 161, Saskatchewan: 533
Matimekosh, Quebec: 528
Wapachewunak 192D, Saskatchewan: 526
Anahim's Flat 1, British Columbia: 526
Kitamaat 2, British Columbia: 514 — Haisla Nation, Haisla people, Kitimat
Cowessess 73, Saskatchewan: 4295 846 on-reserve &  3449 off-reserve
Alderville First Nation, Ontario: 506
Kahkewistahaw 72, Saskatchewan: 506
Timiskaming, Quebec: 505
The Narrows 49, Manitoba: 505
Eel Ground 2, New Brunswick: 503
Keeseekoose 66, Saskatchewan: 500
Stoney Point Aazhoodena:  #43

2001 Census
Tsuu T'ina Nation 145, Alberta: 1,982
Wendake, Quebec: 1,555
Factory Island 1, Ontario: 1,430
Attawapiskat 91A, Ontario: 1,293

See also

 List of Indian reserves in Canada
 List of First Nations peoples
List of First Nations governments
List of place names in Canada of Aboriginal origin
 Classification of indigenous peoples of the Americas

References

Demographics of Canada

Indian reserves by population